I Don't Feel at Home in This World Anymore (often stylized I don't feel at home in this world anymore.) is a 2017 American comedy thriller film written and directed by Macon Blair in his directorial debut. It stars Melanie Lynskey, Elijah Wood, David Yow, Jane Levy and Devon Graye. The film's title originates from an old gospel song "I Don't Feel at Home in This World Anymore", which was popularised by country singers Carter Family and Woody Guthrie.

The film had its world premiere at the Sundance Film Festival on January 19, 2017; it went on to win the Grand Jury Prize for the U.S. Dramatic competition. It was released by Netflix on 24 February 2017.

Plot
Nursing assistant Ruth returns home from a bad day at work to find she has been burgled. She reports to the police that the thief has stolen her medication, her grandmother's silverware and a laptop computer. When she asks Detective William Bendix for advice, he merely chastises her for leaving her door unlocked. Ruth asks her neighbors if they saw anything suspicious; one of them, Tony, becomes enraged that someone would target a neighbor. When a mobile app reveals the location of her laptop and the police refuse to do anything, she enlists Tony's help.

Ruth and Tony go to the location, where Ruth intimidates the owner into returning her laptop. He claims that he bought it from a fence who operates a resale shop. Ruth and Tony investigate the shop the next morning, where they find the stolen silverware and a man whose shoe matches a print left in her yard. Ruth gets into a scuffle with the owner when he demands she pay for the stolen silverware, and after he breaks her finger, Tony knocks him unconscious, at which point the two flee.

Tony, having recorded the license plate number on the thief's van, researches it and learns that it is registered to someone named Christian Rumack. Ruth and Tony impersonate cops at the address belonging to the van, where a woman named Meredith lets them inside. She reveals that the owner of the van, her husband Chris, is not the one who uses the van; it is instead her step-son, who was given the van by his father. Chris Senior returns home abruptly with his bodyguard Cesar. Ruth states that she only wants to confront Christian about his behavior, but Chris taunts her for her idealism and kicks them out. As they leave, Ruth steals lawn art from Chris and Meredith. Disillusioned with Ruth's behavior, Tony goes back to his house, leaving Ruth alone.

Christian and his friends, Marshall and Dez, watch from the side, calling off their intended robbery of Chris. They send Christian to confront Ruth about what she knows about them. He surprises her inside her home, and she crushes his windpipe in self-defense. As he staggers into the street, a bus strikes and kills him. Marshall and Dez kidnap Ruth, forcing her to take Christian's place in their heist. Ruth gains them entry into the mansion, where Meredith and Cesar are held at gunpoint and told to summon Chris. A battle ensues, during which Tony comes to Ruth's aid and is badly wounded; Cesar, Chris, and Dez are killed; and Meredith escapes. Ruth and Tony flee into the woods behind the mansion, with Marshall close behind. Ruth hides Tony under some foliage, then attacks Marshall by throwing rocks at him, and his sudden movements cause him to be bitten by a water moccasin. Panicked that she cannot find Tony on her way back, Ruth sees her grandmother's ghost point her in the correct direction.

Grateful that Ruth saved her life, Meredith neglects to identify her as one of the burglars to Bendix. Ruth returns to her daily life with Tony, who survived his wounds.

Cast
 Melanie Lynskey as Ruth Kimke
 Elijah Wood as Tony
 David Yow as Marshall
 Jane Levy as Dez
 Devon Graye as Christian Rumack, Jr.
 Christine Woods as Meredith
 Robert Longstreet as Christian Rumack
 Gary Anthony Williams as William Bendix
 Lee Eddy as Angie 
 Derek Mears as Donkey
 Jason Manuel Olazabal as Cesar
 Maxwell Hamilton as Smoker
 Matt Orduna as Dan
 Michelle Moreno as Jana Huff
 Jeb  Berrier as Gearhead
Writer and director Macon Blair makes a cameo appearance as a man Ruth meets at a bar. The movie is dedicated "For Lee & Buck."  (Lee Eddy who played Angie and Buck Eddy-Blair who played young Ruth.)

Macon Blair's mother, Robin Blair, plays the role of Grandma Sally in the film.

Production
In April 2016, it was announced Melanie Lynskey and Elijah Wood had been cast in the film, with Macon Blair writing and directing the film.

Principal photography began in April 2016, in Portland, Oregon.

Release
The film had its world premiere at the Sundance Film Festival on January 19, 2017. It received a worldwide release on February 24, 2017, streaming exclusively on Netflix.

Critical reception
On review aggregator Rotten Tomatoes, the film holds an approval rating of 89% based on 62 reviews, with an average rating of 7.4/10. The website's critical consensus reads, "I Don't Feel At Home In This World Anymore transcends its unwieldy title to offer timely, intoxicatingly dark observations on gender dynamics and social norms in modern America." On Metacritic, the film has a 75 out of 100 rating, based on 15 reviews, indicating "generally favorable reviews".

Accolades

References

External links
 
 

2017 films
American drama films
American crime films
English-language Netflix original films
Films shot in Portland, Oregon
American films about revenge
2017 directorial debut films
2010s English-language films
2010s American films